Gromoslavka is a rural locality (a selo) and the administrative center of Gromoslavskoye Rural Settlement, Oktyabrsky District, Volgograd Oblast, Russia. The population was 582 as of 2010. There are 22 streets.

Geography 
Gromoslavka is located in steppe, on Yergeni, on the Myshkova River, 32 km north of Oktyabrsky (the district's administrative centre) by road. Ivanovka is the nearest rural locality.

References 

Rural localities in Oktyabrsky District, Volgograd Oblast
Don Host Oblast